Hybos culiciformis, common name dance fly, is a species of  fly belonging to the family hybotid.

Description
Hybos culiciformis can reach a size of 3.5 to 5.5 mm. It has large yellowish thoracic setae, row of setae on the mid femur and strong setae on mid tibiae. Mesonotum is finely dusted. It flies from June to September and feeds on small insects.

Distribution and habitat
This species is widespread in Europe and in the Near East. It can be found in woodland edges and on hedgerows.

References

External links

 Online Keys
 Biolib
 Fauna europaea
 Global Species
 Nature Spot
 Commanster

Hybotidae
Articles containing video clips
Insects described in 1775
Taxa named by Johan Christian Fabricius
Asilomorph flies of Europe